This is a list of power stations in the U.S. state of California that are used for utility-scale electricity generation. This includes baseload, peaking, and energy storage power stations, but does not include large backup generators. , California had 80 GW of installed generation capacity encompassing more than 1,500 power plants; with 41 GW of natural gas, 26.5 GW of renewable (12 GW solar, 6 GW wind), 12 GW large hydroelectric, and 2.4 GW nuclear.

In 2020, California had a total summer capacity of 78,055 MW through all of its power plants, and a net energy generation of 193,075 GWh. Its electricity production was the third largest in the nation behind Texas and Florida. California ranks first in the nation as a producer of solar, geothermal, and biomass resources. Utility-scale solar photovoltaic and thermal sources together generated 17% of electricity in 2021. Small-scale solar including customer-owned PV panels delivered an additional net 19,828 GWh to California's electrical grid, equal to about half the generation by the state's utility-scale facilities.

The Diablo Canyon Power Plant in San Luis Obispo County is the largest power station in California with a nameplate capacity of 2,256 MW and an annual generation of 18,214 GWh in 2018. The largest under construction is the Westlands Solar Park in Kings County, which will generate 2,000 MW when completed in 2025.

The California Independent System Operator (CAISO) oversees the operation of its member utilities.

Battery storage
This is a list of operational battery storage power stations in California with a nameplate capacity of at least 10 megawatts.

Biomass

This is a list of operational biomass and biogas power stations in California with a nameplate capacity of at least 10 megawatts.

Coal
The Argus Cogeneration Plant in San Bernardino County is the only coal-fired power station still operating within the state of California. The Intermountain Power Plant (which is 75% owned by LADWP along with five other Los Angeles area cities) in the state of Utah supplied 20% of the electricity consumed by Los Angeles residents in 2017.

Geothermal

This is a list of all operational geothermal power stations in California.

Hydroelectric

Conventional

Conventional hydroelectric power stations include traditional reservoir and run-of-the-river hydroelectric power stations. The list below includes all conventional hydroelectric power station in the state with a nameplate capacity of at least 50 megawatts.

Pumped-storage

Pumped-storage hydroelectricity is important means of large-scale grid energy storage that helps improve the daily capacity factor of California's electricity generation system. This is a list of all operational pumped-storage power stations in California.

Natural gas

This is a list of operational natural gas-fired power stations in California with a nameplate capacity of at least 100 megawatts.

Nuclear

The Diablo Canyon Power Plant has been the only nuclear power station in California since the closure of the San Onofre Nuclear Generating Station in 2013. Due to the changing dynamics of electricity generation in California, Diablo Canyon is scheduled to be decommissioned in 2025. The Palo Verde Nuclear Generating Station (the largest power generator in the United States), which is 27% owned by California power agencies, in the neighboring state of Arizona supplies a significant amount of power to southern California.

Petroleum
This is a list of operational petroleum-fired power stations in California.

Solar

Photovoltaic

List of very large (>100MW) solar photovoltaic power stations in California as of January 1, 2019.
To update and expand this list, search the Energy Information Administration's plant-level data set by visiting the Electricity Data Browser.Alternatively, view the Solar Industry Association's Major Solar Projects List which is less frequently updated.

Thermal

This is a list of all operational solar thermal power stations in California.

Wind

This is a list of all operational wind farms in California.

Under construction
This is a list of power stations under construction in California.

Former facilities

See also

List of dams and reservoirs in California
List of power stations in the United States

References

Nuclear Energy in California (CA.gov): http://www.energy.ca.gov/nuclear/california.html  retrieved: 11/10/12

External links

U.S. Department of Energy California Statistics
U.S. Department of Energy California Quick Facts
Calenergy Geothermal Plant Information

California

Power stations